Diament may refer to:

 James Westcott, also known as James Diament Westcott, Jr.
 Rob Diament, English singer-songwriter 
 Popiół i diament, Polish title for the novel Ashes and Diamonds

See also
 Diamond (disambiguation)
 Diamant (disambiguation)
 Dimond (disambiguation)
 Dymond (disambiguation)
 Dyment (disambiguation)
Diament, Świętokrzyskie Voivodeship (south-central Poland)